Craig Hutchison may refer to:

Craig Hutchison (broadcaster) (born 1974), Australian sports broadcaster
Craig Hutchison (swimmer) (born 1975), Canadian freestyle swimmer

See also
Craig Hutchinson (1891–1976), American director and screenwriter